Alborada is a 2021 Sri Lankan multilingual biographical romantic film directed by Asoka Handagama and produced by H.D. Premasiri for Sarasavi Cineroo. The film is based on the fictionalized sex life of Chile's Nobel Laureate Pablo Neruda from 1929 to 1931 in Sri Lanka. It stars Luis J. Romero and Anne Solen Hatte in lead role whereas Dominic Keller, Malcolm Machado and Rithika Kodithuwakku made supportive roles. The Sinhala meaning of 'Alborada' is "the dawning of the day".

Plot

Cast
 Luis J. Romero as Pablo Neruda
 Anne Solen Hatte as Josie Bliss, Neruda's Burmese girlfriend
 Dominic Keller as Lionel Wendt
 Nimaya Harris as Patsy, Neruda's liberated girlfriend
 Malcolm Machado as Servant Ratnaiya
 Rithika Kodithuwakku as the Tamil garbage cleaner woman
 Thusitha Laknath
 Samantha Balasuriya
 Juliyan Kawshalya Mendis
 Krishantha Jayabahu
 Adam Smyth
 Lewis Bower 
 Conrad Ford
 Rebecca Russell-Turner
 Kasun Perera
 Kanchana Nandani

Production
The first information about Pablo Neruda's presence as Chilean Consul of Sri Lanka and the experiences he encountered in Sri Lanka was first found by Handagama in Tissa Abeysekera's book "Ayaale Giya Sithak". It was in those days that the idea of ​​making a film based on that incident came to his mind.  Even though he started to write the script with a romance-based plot, he later realized that Neruda has raped a Tamil garbage collecting female lady during his visit to Sri Lanka.

Meanwhile, women's and student movements are protesting against a proposal in parliament to rename Chile's main airport, Santiago, in 2018, as Pablo Neruda Airport. Due to the strength of the opposition the government has to withdraw the resolution. The script was fully prepared throughout 2019 and it was decided to shoot in 2020 amidst COVID-19 pandemic. The casting of the film was too difficult with searching fresh faces that can speak Spanish and foreign look. Although a Chilean actor was first screened, his dates did not match with COVID situation. Handagama then screened Luis Romero, a young Spanish actor and poet who knew Neruda well and loved him. Then he chose Anne Solen, a French actress of Asian descent, for the role of Neruda's Burmese girlfriend. As soon as the first corona curfew was over, the filming was started.

For all the other roles, Sri Lankan artists of foreign origin were selected. The role of Lionel Wendt is played by Dominic Keller. Nimaya Harris as Neruda's liberated girlfriend. Malcolm Machado plays the servant and Rithika Kodithuwakku plays as the Tamil garbage cleaner. The main language of the film is English but also had to use Spanish when reciting poetry because the flow of words with syllables comes exactly from the original language of Neruda. Tamil and Sinhala languages were used when necessary as well as subtitled.

The production plan of the film was done by Nimal Dushmantha. Then he built Ranminithenna cinema village as a model of the old Colombo Fort. Nonagama was selected as the scene of the Sakkili community singing.

Release
The media screening was held at the PVR Cinema Hall under the patronage of the Minister of Mass Media and Information, Dullas Alahapperuma. A special screening of the film was held on 29 December 2021 at the Multiplex Cinema Hall in Kandy City Center.

The film and Neruda's memoir translated by Saman Wickramaarachchi was officially released under the title 'Mata Mathaka Ma' on 14 February 2022. However, the film was released for a limited number of days where the show is set to end on March 3.

Recognition
The film received mostly positive reviews from critics. The film competed in the International Competition Section at the 34th Tokyo International Film Festival (2021) in Japan and the 10th Asian Film Festival Barcelona in Spain.

References

External links
 
 Official trailer

2021 films
2021 romantic drama films
Sri Lankan romantic drama films
2020s English-language films